Barbara Lewis King (August 26, 1930 – October 11, 2020) was the first bishop of the International New Thought Christian Movement of Churches. She was also the founder of Hillside International Chapel and Truth Center.

Biography 
Barbara Lewis King was born in Houston, Texas, to parents Mildred Jackson Shackelford, and Lec Andrew Lewis. She was raised by her paternal grandmother, Ida Bates Lewis. At the age of 13, she volunteered as a Sunday school teacher. At 15, King became a Woman's Day speaker in history at Houston's Antioch Baptist Church.

King was married, with one son, Michael, whom she had despite doctors' prognosis that she could not have children. King also mothered a young woman from Ghana, was the grandmother of five, and the great-grandmother of three.

King earned a BA in sociology from Texas Southern University and a Masters in social work at Atlanta University’s School of Social Work. She also obtained a Doctor of Ministry from the Ecumenical Theological Seminary of Detroit, Michigan in 2012.

Career 
After obtaining her Masters, King moved to Chicago and worked as a social work administrator, leading the city’s public housing outreach program. There, she met Rev. Johnnie Colemon, who was the first female African American minister she had ever met, and who inspired her decision to enter the ministry. King then worked as the director of administration of Christ Universal Temple, Rev. Colemon’s church, and was mentored by Colemon throughout her ministerial training in New Thought and Traditional Thought at Missouri’s Unity Institute of Continuing Education and the Baptist Training School in Chicago. Following her training, she was ordained twice, first by Rev. Roy Blake and then by Rev. Colemon.

King then became a professor of social work at Clark Atlanta University, and then the dean of students at Spelman College. She started a Bible study group with 12 members, which grew to become Hillside Chapel and Truth Center. In 1971, King founded the Hillside Chapel and Truth Center. The Hillside Chapel is non-denominational and serves around 5,000 people.

In 2001, King was named the Development Chief of the Assin Nsuta village in Ghana, West Africa, an area with historic routes in the Slave Route Site. She was the first woman to be ordained as a chief in the region. Her stool name is Nana Yaa Twunmwaa I.

King was the first Bishop in the International New Thought Christian Movement. She was committed to “[transforming] lives by practicing and demonstrating the teachings of Jesus The Christ”. She taught and ministered in Finland, Russia, England, Canada, Israel, Egypt, Kenya, Senegal, South Africa, the Caribbean, Brazil, British Guiana (Guyana), and Australia. She led the formation of Hillside Fountain, a South African sister church to her Atlanta church.
She ordained the first New Thought minister in South Africa and joined the Sisters of the Boa Morte in Brazil, African origin nuns who were prohibited from serving the traditional church. In 2010, she became the first bishop of the New Thought Christian Movement of Churches.

She was a guest lecturer at Harvard Divinity School Summer Institute for Ministers, and was also involved with Association of Global New Thought, Concerned Black Clergy of Metropolitan Atlanta, Regional Council of Churches, the American Jewish Committee, Life Members of the NAACP, Academy of Certified Social Workers, National Association of Social Workers, Life Member of the National Council of Negro Women, the National Women's Law Center, Chaplain of the City of Atlanta Police Department, and the Mayoral Appointee to the Ethics Board of Metro Atlanta.

Honors 
 The International New Thought Alliance (INTA) Life Achievement Award
The Ernest Holmes Religious Science Award
Unity's The Light of God Expressing Award
International Civil Rights Walk of Fame, for her work in Dr. Martin Luther King's Chicago movement
 No. 8 on Savoy Magazine's Power Issue of 100 Most Influential Blacks in America in 2008
 Beautiful Are Their Feet Honoree 
International Hall of Honor at Martin Luther King Jr. International Chapel at Morehouse College

Works 
Transform Your Life
Major contributor to A New Thought for A New Millennium and Wake Up … Live the Life You Love in Spirit
In Me, As Me: Ten Principles for Finding the Divine Within and Leave With Love: A Spiritual Guide to Succession Planning
Piddlin’ For the Soul 
How to Have Flood and Not Drown: Essays on Stress-Free Living 
The Church: A Matter of Consciousness
What is a Miracle?
Prosperity that Can’t Quit

References 

Writers from Houston
Clark Atlanta University faculty
Texas Southern University alumni
Atlanta University alumni
2020 deaths
New Thought clergy
Religious leaders from Texas
Writers from Atlanta
Religious leaders from Georgia (U.S. state)
American religious writers
Women religious writers
American women non-fiction writers
Spelman College faculty
Women deans (academic)
1930 births